Sunich Saveh Futsal Club (Bashgah-e Futsal-e Sin-e Ayece-ye Saveh) is an Iranian professional futsal club based in Saveh.

Season to season
The table below chronicles the achievements of the Club in various competitions.

Last updated: 14 March 2022

Honours 
 Iran Futsal's 1st Division
 Winners (1): 2017–18

Players

Current squad

Personnel

Current technical staff

Last updated: 7 December 2022

References 

Futsal clubs in Iran
Sport in Saveh
2001 establishments in Iran
Futsal clubs established in 2001